Fielmann AG is a German eye-wear company.

The Fielmann stock is listed in the German SDAX index and at the northern German regional HASPAX index. With 5% of all optical stores, Fielmann achieved a 21% sales market share and a 53% market share in terms of units sold. Fielmann is market leader in Germany and Europe's largest optician.

History
In 1972 Günther Fielmann established the first store in Cuxhaven. In 1981, Fielmann negotiated an agreement with the Esens statutory health insurance company, which allowed a larger selection of frames to be added to the portfolio for patients covered by the insurance.

Fielmann has been listed on the stock exchange since 1994. Its stock indexing advanced from SDAX to MDAX on 6 January 2009, but was dropped to SDAX in December 2019.

The non-profit Fielmann-Akademie was established by the company in 2001. Located in Plön Castle, Schleswig-Holstein it is a training centre for optometrists since 2002.

Since 2019, Marc Fielmann has been the sole CEO of the company, succeeding his father Günther Fielmann.

Other activities
Fielmann plants a tree for every employee every year. In 2009, chancellor Angela Merkel, minister-president Peter Harry Carstensen and Günther Fielmann planted the one-millionth tree in Büdelsdorf.

References

External links
 Website Fielmann Germany
 Corporate Website Fielmann AG
 Fielmann-Akademie at Plön Castle

Companies based in Hamburg
German brands
Eyewear retailers in Germany
Eyewear brands of Germany
Retail companies established in 1972
1972 establishments in West Germany
Eyewear companies of Germany